The men's 10,000 metres race of the 2013 World Single Distance Speed Skating Championships was held on 23 March at 14:25 local time.

Results

References

Men 10000